The 2015–16 Bobsleigh World Cup was a multi-race tournament over a season for bobsleigh. The season started on 27 November 2015 in Altenberg, Germany and ended on 28 February 2016 in Königssee, Germany. The World Cup was organised by the IBSF (formerly the FIBT) who also run World Cups and Championships in skeleton. The season was sponsored by BMW.

Calendar 
Below is the schedule of the 2015/16 season.

Results

Two-man

Four-man

Two-woman

Standings

Two-men

Four-man

Two-woman

References

External links 
 IBSF

Bobsleigh World Cup
2015 in bobsleigh
2016 in bobsleigh